Sir William Alexander Denny  (born 5 August 1943) is a New Zealand medicinal chemist, noted for his work investigating drugs for the treatment of cancer.

Early life and education
Denny was born in Malvern, Worcestershire, England, on 5 August 1943. His parents were Norah May and Alexander William Denny. The family emigrated to New Zealand in 1946. He received his education at Patumahoe Primary School and Te Awamutu College where he was dux in 1961. At the University of Auckland, he obtained a Bachelor of Science in 1966, a Master of Science in 1967, a Doctor of Philosophy in 1969, and a Doctor of Science in 1986. He had an ICI (Imperial Chemical Industries) post-doctoral fellowship at Oxford University from 1969 to 1972.

Career
From 1972 to 1979, he was a senior research fellow at the Auckland Cancer Research Laboratory. He was visiting professor at the University of California in San Diego from 1979 to 1981. He then returned to the Cancer Research Laboratory and from 1988, was their director. In 2011 Denny was made a Distinguished Professor at the University of Auckland.

Honours and awards
Denny won a Union for International Cancer Control International Travel Fellowship in 1984. In 1986, he won the ICI New Zealand prize for excellence in research.

Denny was elected a Fellow of the New Zealand Institute of Chemistry in 1981 and a Fellow of the Royal Society of New Zealand in 1988. In 1995, he was awarded the society's Rutherford Medal, alongside the Auckland Cancer Research Laboratory, for innovation in the development of new anti-cancer drugs.

In the 2003 Queen's Birthday Honours, Denny was appointed an Officer of the New Zealand Order of Merit, for services to cancer research. He was promoted to Knight Companion of the New Zealand Order of Merit, for services to medical research, in the 2021 Queen's Birthday Honours.

Denny was inducted into the American Chemical Society Division of Medicinal Chemistry Hall of Fame in 2016.

References

1943 births
Living people
People from Malvern, Worcestershire
New Zealand chemists
New Zealand medical researchers
Academic staff of the University of Auckland
Knights Companion of the New Zealand Order of Merit
University of Auckland alumni
English emigrants to New Zealand
Fellows of the New Zealand Institute of Chemistry
Fellows of the Royal Society of New Zealand
Recipients of the Rutherford Medal
People educated at Te Awamutu College